Katihar Junction railway station serves Katihar city in Katihar district in the Indian state of Bihar. It is an A Category railway station of  Division. The Katihar Junction railway station is connected to most of the major cities in India by the railway network.

Katihar lies in between Barauni–Katihar section of Barauni–Guwahati lineKatihar–Siliguri line which serves the city with numerous trains to Guwahati, Kolkata, Delhi, Muzaffarpur, Patna, Gorakhpur, Lucknow and with many other cities. It is ISO certified ISO 14001:2015 for its clean and green environment throughout the station premises.

History
East Indian Railway Company opened the Manihari–Katihar–Kasba section in 1888 and the North Bengal Railway opened the Katihar–Raiganj section the same year. The Barsoi–Kishanganj section opened in 1889. All these lines were -wide metre-gauge lines.

Siliguri was connected to Kolkata via the eastern part of Bengal since 1878 (for details see Howrah–New Jalpaiguri line). However, with the partition of India in 1947, railway services in the region were completely disrupted. In 1949, the narrow-gauge Siliguri–Kishanganj section was upgraded to metre gauge. Thus there was a direct metre-gauge connection from Manihari to Siliguri via Katihar. The importance of Katihar station grew because of the jute mill in the region.

Development 
In the early 1960s, when Farakka Barrage was being constructed, Indian Railways took the initiative to extend  broad-gauge rail link from Kolkata.

The rail bridge was opened in 1971 thereby linking the Barharwa–Azimganj–Katwa loop to Malda,  and other railway stations in North Bengal.

Gauge conversion work (from metre gauge to broad gauge) in the Barauni–Katihar section was taken up in 1978–79 and completed in 1982.

The Siliguri–Katihar line was the last surviving metre-gauge line in the area. The Aluabari Road–Katihar section already had a broad-gauge line running alongside the metre-gauge line. The Aluabari Road–Siliguri section needed to be converted. Conversion work was taken up in 2008, train services in the section was suspended and conversion work completed early in 2011.

Station Facilities
Following services available in Katihar Jn. Railway Station:

 10 (02 Bedded) AC Retiring Rooms 
 05 (02 Bedded) Non AC Retiring Rooms 
 01 (08 Bedded) AC Dormitory 
 04 (01 Bedded) AC Cabin Dormitory 
 01 (06 Bedded) Non AC Dormitory 
 Executive Lounge
 High Speed  Google Railwire Free Wi-Fi service 
 Upper Class/Lower Class Waiting Rooms having Free Wi-Fi/AC/TV/Charging points/Drinking water & separate Ladies/Gents Washrooms 
 Food Plaza 
 Tea Stall 
 FOB with 4X  Escalator/Elevators  3X
 CCTV Surveillance

Platforms 
There are 8 functional platforms at Katihar Junction which are interconnected & have multiple foot overbridges.

Gallery

References

External links
 

Katihar railway division
Railway stations in Katihar district
Railway stations in India opened in 1889
Railway junction stations in Bihar
Transport in Katihar